Maria Isaura Pereira de Queiroz (August 26, 1918 – December 29, 2018) was a Brazilian sociologist.

Biography 
She obtained her degree in Social Sciences from the University of São Paulo (1949), Diploma of Graduate Studies in sociology, anthropology and politics from the University of São Paulo (1951) and a doctorate degree in Sociology from the École pratique des hautes études Section VI (1959).

Her dissertation is titled: La Guerre Sainte au Brésil: le Mouvement Messianique du Contestado, (in English: "The Holy War in Brazil: the Messianic Movement of Contestado") under the direction of Roger Bastide, 1960. Her dissertation was published by the University of São Paulo with the title: "Le Messianisme au Brésil et dans au Monde", in 1963. Her works are referenced worldwide.

Her last position was as professor at the Centro de Estudos Rurais e Urbanos (in English: Center for Urban and Rural Studies), which she founded,  and was Professor Emeritus at the University of São Paulo.

Pereira de Queiróz spoke or understood the following languages: Spanish, French, English and Italian. She died in December 2018 at the age of 100.

Visiting Professor 

 1953 Universidade Federal do Paraná, UFPR, Brazil
 1959 Fundação Escola de Sociologia e Política de São Paulo, FESPSP, Brazil
 1963 - 1964 Université de Paris VI (Pierre et Marie Curie), UP VI, France
 1964 Laval University, U L, Quebec
 1969 Universidade Federal da Bahia, UFBA, Brazil
 1970 Universidade Federal de Santa Catarina, UFSC, Brazil
 1978 - 1979 Université de Paris III (Sorbonne-Nouvelle), U P III, France
 1979 Université des Mutants, U M, Senegal
 1980 Université de Louvain La Neuve, U LN, Belgium

Awards and distinctions 

 1957 : XI Concurso Mário de Andrade de Monografias Sobre Folclore, Departamento de Cultura do Município de São Paulo.
 1966 : Prêmio Jabuti - Melhor Obra de Ciências Sociais, Câmara Brasileira do Livro.
 1990 : Professora Emérita da Universidade de São Paulo, Universidade de São Paulo.
 1997 : Prêmio Almirante Álavaro Alberto para Ciência e Tecnologia - Cientista do Ano, Centro Nacional de Desenvolvimento Científico e Tecnológico - Ministério de Ciência e Tecnologia.
 1999 : Prêmio Multicultural Estadão, O Estado de São Paulo.

Bibliography 

 with Roger Bastide: « ensaios e pesquisa » São Paulo : centro de estudos rurais e urbanos, textos, n 5, 1994
 Li cangaceiros: i banditi d'onore Napoli : liguori ed, 1993
 « O imaginário em terra conquistada » São Paulo : centro de estudos rurais e urbanos, 1993 V 4 146 p
 Carnaval brasileiro: o vivido e o mito São Paulo : brasiliense, 1992
 Os cangaceiros: la epopeya bandolera del nordeste del brasil Bogotá: el áncora, 1992
 Carnaval brésilien : le vécu et le mythe Paris: gallimard ed, 1992
 Variações sobre a técnica de gravador no registro da informação viva São Paulo: ceru/fflch/usp (coleção textos, 4), 1983
 with Roger Bastide : uma antologia São Paulo: ed Ática, 1983
 História do cangaço São Paulo: ed Global, 1982
 Cultura, sociedade rural e sociedade urbana no brasil Rio de Janeiro: livros técnicos e científicos/edusp, 1978
 Cultura, sociedade rural e sociedade urbana São Paulo: livros técnicos e ciêntíficos/edusp, 1978
 Os cangaceiros São Paulo: duas cidades, 1977
 Bairros rurais paulistas (dinâmica das relações bairro rural/cidade) São Paulo: duas cidades, 1973
 O campesinato brasileiro (ensaios sobre civilização e grupos rústicos no brasil) Petrópolis: vozes, 1973
 Reform and revolution in tradicionnal societies New york: Harper and Row, 1971
 Images messianiques du brésil Cidade do méxico: ed Cidoc-sondeos, 1971
 O mandonismo local na vida política do brasil São Paulo: institutos de estudos brasileiros/usp, 1970
 Riforma e rivoluzione nelle societá tradizionale Milão: edizione jaca book, 1970
 Réforme et révolution dans les sociétés traditionnelles Paris: ed Anthropos, 1969
 Los movimentos mesiánicos Cidade do méxico: siglo veintiuno editores, 1969
 Os cangaceiros: les bandits d'honneur brésilliens Paris: ed Julliard, 1968
 O messiamismo no brasil e no mundo São Paulo: dominus/edusp, 1965
 Sociologia e folclore: a dança de são gonçalo num povoado baiano Salvador: livraria progresso, 1958
 La guerre sainte au brésil: le mouvemente messianique du contestado São Paulo: faculdade de filosofia, ciências e letras - usp, 1957

See also

 Collective memory
 Folklore

External links

  Données personnelles sur Maria Isaura Pereira de Queiroz (buscatextual.cnpq.br)
  De Pereira de Queiróz Lire en ligne : « Roger Bastide, professor da Universidade de São Paulo », Estudos Avançados, vol.8 no.22,  São Paulo Sept./Dec. 1994
   Lire en ligne : « Un échange dénié, La traduction d’auteurs brésiliens en Argentine », Actes de la recherche en sciences sociales, no 145 – 2002/5, p. 61 à 70 -  (www.cairn.info)

References

1918 births
2018 deaths
Brazilian centenarians
Brazilian sociologists
University of São Paulo alumni
Academic staff of Sorbonne Nouvelle University Paris 3
Women centenarians